Whitespace is an esoteric programming language developed by Edwin Brady and Chris Morris at the University of Durham (also developers of the Kaya and Idris programming languages). It was released on 1 April 2003 (April Fool's Day). Its name is a reference to whitespace characters. Unlike most programming languages, which ignore or assign little meaning to most whitespace characters, the Whitespace interpreter ignores any non-whitespace characters. Only spaces, tabs and linefeeds have meaning.

A consequence of this property is that a Whitespace program can easily be contained within the whitespace characters of a program written in a language which ignores whitespace, making the text a polyglot.

The language itself is an imperative stack-based language. The virtual machine on which the programs run has a stack and a heap. The programmer is free to push arbitrary-width integers onto the stack (currently there is no implementation of floating point numbers) and can also access the heap as a permanent store for variables and data structures.

History 
Whitespace was created by Edwin Brady and Chris Morris in 2002. Slashdot gave a review of this programming language on 1 April 2003.

The idea of using whitespace characters as operators for the C++ language had been facetiously suggested five years earlier by Bjarne Stroustrup.

Syntax 
Commands are composed of sequences of spaces, tab stops and linefeeds. All other characters are ignored and thus can be used for comments. For example, tab-space-space-space performs arithmetic addition of the top two elements on the stack.

Code is written as an Instruction Modification Parameter (IMP) followed by the operation. The table below shows a list of all the IMPs in Whitespace.

Each IMP is followed by one operation defined for that IMP, and a parameter if needed. The list of operations supported in Whitespace is:

The "copy" and "slide" operations were added in Whitespace 0.3 and may not be supported by all implementations.

Numbers 
Numbers are composed of spaces (0) and tabs (1), and they are terminated by a linefeed. The first space/tab in the number represents the sign of the number, if it's a space the number is positive, if it's a tab the number is negative. The rest of the trailing spaces and tabs represent the rest of the binary number.

Examples 

space-tab-space-space-tab-space-tab-tab-linefeed (STSSTSTTL) represents the binary number 1001011 (positive, because the number starts with a space) => 75 in decimal.
 
tab-tab-tab-space-space-tab-space-linefeed (TTTSSTSL) represents the binary number 110010 (negative, because the number starts with a tab) => -50 in decimal.

Labels 
Labels are simply [LF] terminated lists of spaces and tabs. There is only one global namespace so all labels must be unique.

Sample code

The following is a commented Whitespace program that simply prints "Hello, world!", where each Space, Tab, or Linefeed character is preceded by the identifying comment "S", "T", or "L", respectively:
 S S S T	S S T	S S S L:Push_+1001000=72='H'_onto_the_stack
T	L
S S :Output_'H';_S S S T	T	S S T	S T	L:Push_+1100101=101='e'_onto_the_stack
T	L
S S :Output_'e';_S S S T	T	S T	T	S S L:+1101100=108='l'
T	L
S S S S S T	T	S T	T	S S L:+1101100=108='l'
T	L
S S S S S T	T	S T	T	T	T	L:+1101111=111='o'
T	L
S S S S S T	S T	T	S S L:+101100=44=','
T	L
S S S S S T	S S S S S L:+100000=32=Space
T	L
S S S S S T	T	T	S T	T	T	L:+1110111=119='w'
T	L
S S S S S T	T	S T	T	T	T	L:+1101111=111='o'
T	L
S S S S S T	T	T	S S T	S L:+1110010=114='r'
T	L
S S S S S T	T	S T	T	S S L:+1101100=108='l'
T	L
S S S S S T	T	S S T	S S L=+1100100=100='d'
T	L
S S S S S T	S S S S T	L:+100001=33='!'
T	L
S S :Output_'!';_L
L
L:End_the_program

Note that when Whitespace source code is displayed in some browsers, the horizontal spacing produced by a tab character is not fixed, but depends on its location in the text relative to the next horizontal tab stop. Depending on the software, tab characters may also get replaced by the corresponding variable number of space characters.

See also
 Polyglot, a program valid in more than one language
 Steganography, the technique of concealing a message within another message
 Off-side rule languages, where blocks are expressed by whitespace indentation
 Python, the best-known example of a language with syntactically significant whitespace
 Esoteric programming languages
 Brainfuck, which consists of only eight simple commands and an instruction pointer
 INTERCAL, the "Compiler Language With No Pronounceable Acronym"
 LOLCODE, which is patterned after a series of Internet memes
 Malbolge, which is specifically designed to be nearly impossible to program in

References

External links

Release announcement on Slashdot
The Whitespace Corpus A collection of interpreters, compilers, and programs for Whitespace
Collection of Whitespace interpreters in various script languages
Acme::Bleach A Perl module that rewrites the body of your module to a whitespace-only encoding ("for really clean programs").

Non-English-based programming languages
Esoteric programming languages
Whitespace
Programming languages created in 2002
Stack-oriented programming languages